Papal Count Patrick Finbar Ryan, TC, O.P., (1881-1975) was an Irish Dominican priest who served as Archbishop of Port of Spain, Trinidad (1940–1966).

Patrick Ryan was born in Rochestown, County Cork, the son of Edward Ryan, and Matilda Ryan. on 4 March 1881. He was initially educated at Christian Brothers College, Cork, and Clongowes Wood College. He then entered St. Mary's Priory, Tallaght to become a Dominican. At St. Mary's, he also studied at University College Dublin, Royal University of Ireland, and subsequently moved to study at Sapienza University of Rome. He was ordained a priest of the Dominicans Order at the Irish Dominican run, Basilica of San Clemente, Rome, in 1905.  

He taught at the Dominican secondary school Newbridge College in County Kildare, serving as Dean. In 1915, he became Prior at St. Saviour's Church, Dominick St., Dublin, until 1919, when he moved to Cork (city) as Prior of St. Mary's Church, Pope's Quay. He edited the Dominican publication the Irish Rosary and, in 1921, founded a children's religious magazine, the Imeldist. He served as Provincial of the Dominicans in Ireland twice - from 1921 to 1926 and, again, from 1930 to 1934. 

He was appointed co-adjudicator bishop of Port of Spain, Trinidad in 1937, before being elevated to Archbishop in 1940. In 1943, he established the Seminary of St. John Vianney and the Uganda Martyrs in Tunapuna, Trinidad. In 1946, he invited the Irish Presentation Brothers and, in 1947, the Holy Faith Sisters to set up schools in the diocese.

He attended the Second Vatican Council, 1962-1965.

He retired in 1966 and moved back to Ireland. He died on 10 January 1975, in Cork.

Awards

In 1937, Fr Ryan was awarded the Freedom of Cork City.

In 1950, he was honoured with a knighthood by the Vatican as a Grand Officer of the Supreme Order of Christ becoming a papal count, also in 1969 he was awarded the Trinity Cross by the government of Trinidad and Tobago.

Relatives 

Bishop Ryans's brother was a British diplomat Sir Andrew Ryan, KBE, CMG, whose son was the theologian and like his uncle a Dominican, Rev. Dr. Columba Ryan OP, Another brother, Thomas, served in the Indian civil service and his sister Mary Ryan MA was Professor of Romance Languages at University College Cork, the first female professor in Ireland or the UK.

References

1881 births
1975 deaths
Irish Dominicans
Irish expatriate Catholic bishops
Roman Catholic archbishops of Port of Spain
People educated at Christian Brothers College, Cork
People educated at Clongowes Wood College
Alumni of the Royal University of Ireland
Alumni of University College Dublin
Recipients of the Trinity Cross
Dominican bishops
Papal counts